Terry Alvino (born June 15, 1984, in St. Louis, Missouri) is an American soccer player currently playing for Kalamazoo Outrage in the USL Premier Development League.

He spent three years at the University of the Incarnate Word in San Antonio, Texas where he helped the Cardinals to three straight Division II National Tournament appearances and the school's best finish in Division II, a quarterfinal loss to eventual champions Seattle University.

He transferred to and graduated from the University of Dayton in 2005 and prior to the 2006 season had trials with the Richmond Kickers and Chicago Fire. He has also since played with NZFC outfit Otago United, and American USL First Division side Minnesota Thunder. On September 29, 2008, he signed a contract with Czech Second League club FC Hradec Králové.

External links
Terry Alvino profile at playerhistory.com 

1984 births
American expatriate soccer players
Living people
Kalamazoo Outrage players
Minnesota Thunder players
Southern United FC players
USL First Division players
USL League Two players
Incarnate Word Cardinals men's soccer players
University of Dayton alumni
Soccer players from St. Louis
Association football midfielders
American soccer players